Urowo  (German Auer) is a village in the administrative district of Gmina Zalewo, within Iława County, Warmian-Masurian Voivodeship, in northern Poland.

The village has a population of 130.

References

Urowo